Tomáš Kobes (born 14 May 1978 in Český Krumlov) is a Czech slalom canoeist who competed at the international level from 1995 to 2007.

Kobes won a bronze medal in the K1 team event at the 1999 ICF Canoe Slalom World Championships in La Seu d'Urgell. He also won a silver and a bronze medal in the same event at the European Championships.

Kobes finished seventh in the K1 event at the 2000 Summer Olympics in Sydney.

World Cup individual podiums

References 

 

Czech male canoeists
Olympic canoeists of the Czech Republic
Canoeists at the 2000 Summer Olympics
1978 births
Living people
People from Český Krumlov
Medalists at the ICF Canoe Slalom World Championships
Sportspeople from the South Bohemian Region